Kahn-e Mur may refer to:
 Kahn-e Mur, Sirjan